Mostovoye is a rural locality (a selo) in Novinsky Selsoviet of Belogorsky District, Amur Oblast, Russia. The population was 14 as of 2018. There are 3 streets.

Geography 
Mostovoye is located 46 km southeast of Belogorsk (the district's administrative centre) by road. Lugovoye is the nearest rural locality.

References 

Rural localities in Belogorsky District